Behrend is a German surname.  Notable people with the surname include:

 Felix Behrend (1911–1962), German and Australian mathematician
 Friedrich Jacob Behrend (1803–1889), German physician
 Genevieve Behrend (1881–1960), French-born author
 Gustav Behrend (1847–1925), German dermatologist
 Hermann-Heinrich Behrend (1898–1987), German military officer during World War II
 Jacob Friedrich Behrend (1833–1907), German jurist
 Jeanne Behrend (1911–1988), American pianist and composer
 Kai Behrend, German mathematician
 Katharina Behrend (1888–1973), German-born Dutch photographer
 Louise Behrend (1916–2011), American violinist and academic
 Marc Behrend (born 1961), American ice hockey goaltender
 Rita Behrend, German slalom canoer
 Robert Behrend (1856–1926), German chemist
 Siegfried Behrend (1933–1990), German guitarist
 Tomas Behrend (born 1974), German tennis player
 Issachar Berend Lehmann (1661–1730), Court Jew

See also
Behrend (disambiguation)
Behrends
Behrendt

German-language surnames